A cholesteric liquid-crystal display (ChLCD) is a display containing a liquid crystal with a helical structure and which is therefore chiral. Cholesteric liquid crystals are also known as chiral nematic liquid crystals.  They organize in layers with no positional ordering within layers, but a director axis which varies with layers.  The variation of the director axis tends to be periodic in nature.  The period of this variation (the distance over which a full rotation of 360° is completed) is known as the pitch, p. This pitch determines the wavelength of light which is reflected (Bragg Reflection).

The technology is characterized by stable states i.e. focal conic state (dark state) and planar state (bright state). Displays based on this technology are called “bistable” and don’t need any power to maintain the information (zero power). Because of the reflective nature of the ChLCD, these displays can be perfectly read under sunlight conditions.

Examples of compounds known to form cholesteric phases are hydroxypropyl cellulose and cholesteryl benzoate.

Some companies, such as Chiral Photonics, have begun to explore CLCs as the basis for photonic devices.

A US company, Kent Displays, has developed "no power" Liquid Crystal Displays using Polymer Stabilized Cholesteric Liquid Crystals: these are known as ChLCD screens. A drawback of ChLCD screens is their slow refresh rate, especially at low temperatures. In 2009, Kent demonstrated the use of a ChLCD to cover the entire surface of a mobile phone, allowing it to change colours, and keep that colour even when power is cut off.

The Industrial Technology Research Institute has developed a flexible ePaper called i2R based on ChLCD technology. ITRI

The German company BMG MIS (formerly AEG MIS) has developed “Geameleon”- ChLCDs full color and monochrome in various sizes and resolutions. These ChLCDs can be used in extremely wide temperature applications i.e. for outdoor application. Various update versions can be applied to achieve a reasonable update time even at very low temperatures. Because of its very low power consumption, this technology is highly preferred to be used in self-sustaining applications (solar power applications).

References

Liquid crystals